Mystery, a Canadian rock band, has been playing concerts for much of their career. Early shows took place in their home country and in 2013 they played their first European show at Cultuurpodium Boerderij in the Netherlands. Some dates between 1989 and 1998 may be missing.

Raymond Savoie concerts

Gary Savoie concerts

Benoît David concerts

Early concerts

The World is a Game Tour

Jean Pageau concerts

The World is a Game Tour Leg Two

Tour 2015

Tour 2016

Artrock Festival V Concert

Beneath the Veil of Winter's Face 10th Anniversary Tour

Winter's End Tour 2018

Festivals and the Netherlands

Live And Butterflies Tour 2019

2020 concerts

2022 concerts

2023 concerts

Notes

References

Lists of concert tours